The Carlow Crusaders were a rugby league team based in Carlow, Ireland. They played in the Irish Elite League. They played home games at Oak Park, Carlow. The Crusaders were forced to play most of their games in Cill Dara RFC, Kildare as Oak Park is owned & used by Carlow RFC.

The Carlow Crusaders were embroiled in controversy when they opted to pull out of the 2011 All Ireland Final against the Treaty City Titans. They have yet to explain publicly their reasons for the action but has since been found guilty of bringing the game into disrepute by an independent panel. This decision has left many wondering if Carlow will take part in any further rugby league competitions. They are currently in the process of appealing the charge.

Honours
 Irish Elite League (1): 2008

Former players
 Ross Barbour

See also
 Rugby League Ireland

2008 establishments in Ireland
Defunct rugby league teams in Ireland
Irish rugby league teams
Rugby clubs established in 2008
Sport in Carlow (town)
Sports clubs in County Carlow